The House of Harrach<ref>Possibly from Czech word hrách ("pea"). First known member of the family owned definitely Slavonic name Przibislaus. Indirect evidence of pea's theory — Harrach's coat of arms with an element described in heraldry as "golden ball". </ref> is an old and influential Bohemian and Austro-German noble family. The Grafen (Counts) of Harrach were among the most prominent families in the Habsburg Empire. As one of few mediatized families, it belongs to high nobility.

History

The family first appeared in 1195 in the documents found in Ranshofen Abbey, Duchy of Bavaria. There are two main family branches — Rohrau branch in Austria (until 1886) and Jilemnice branch in Bohemia. They were formed from two sons of Count Karl von Harrach (1570–1628). Two branches were later founded by grandsons of Friedrich August von Harrach-Rohrau — Ernest Christopher Joseph (d. 1838) and Ferdinand Joseph (d. 1841).

 1195 — first mentions of the family in Ranshofen monastery.
 14th century — owned lands in Austria, Carinthia and Styria.
 1524 — Leonhard III von Harrach acquired Rohrau Castle.
 4 January  1552 — Leonhard IV von Harrach (d. 1590) received the title of Imperial Baron from Charles V, Holy Roman Emperor.
 6 November 1627 — Karl von Harrach (1570–1628) received the title of Imperial Count from Ferdinand II, Holy Roman Emperor.
 1701 — Ferdinand Bonaventura I purchased Jilemnice.
 1708 — Aloys Thomas Raimund von Harrach married Countess Cecilia von Thannhausen and attached her surname to his family name.

Residences
The family owned the following properties at various times:
 Rohrau Castle, Rohrau, Austria: formerly the seat of the elder branch; with notable private collection of paintings known as Graf Harrach’sche Familiensammlung (from 1870–1970 kept in Palais Harrach). Rohrau has meanwhile been inherited by the counts of Waldburg-Zeil.
 Prugg Castle, Bruck an der Leitha, Austria: still the seat of the younger branch.
 Palais Harrach an der Freyung, Vienna, Austria (sold to the city in 1975).
 Palais Harrach in der Ungargasse, Vienna, Austria.
 Palais Harrach, Prague, Czech Republic.
 Harrachov (Harrachsdorf): town in Czech Republic with family's glass manufactory (since 1712), well known as Harrachglas brand.
 Hrádek u Nechanic, Czech Republic.
 Jilemnice, Czech Republic.
 Konárovice, Czech Republic.
 Kunín, Czech Republic.
 Lodín, Czech Republic
 Náměšť na Hané, Czech Republic.
 Strkov, Czech Republic.
 Krzeczyn Mały, Poland.

Notable family members

Many of its members bear the title of Graf (count/earl) or Gräfin (countess). Notable members of the family are, among others:

 Przibislaus Harrach (d. 1289) — founder of the family
 Leonhard IV von Harrach (d. 1590)
 Karl von Harrach (1570–1628) — his grandson, Imperial envoy to German sovereigns' courts, Ferdinand II's favourite. His children:
 Ernst Adalbert von Harrach (1598–1667), Archbishop of Prague, Cardinal and Prince-Bishop of Trent.
 Leonhard (d. 1645),  founder of the Rohrau line, the Superior Marshall at the Emperor Ferdinand III Habsburg's court.
 Otto Frederick (d. 1639) founder of the Jilemnice line, soldier and diplomat, brother-in-law of Albrecht von Wallenstein. His son:
 Ferdinand Bonaventura I Graf Harrach (1637–1706), ambassador in Spain before War of the Spanish Succession. His children:
 Franz Anton Graf von Harrach (1665–1727) —  Bishop of Vienna and Archbishop of Salzburg
 Aloys Thomas Raimund Graf Harrach (1669–1742), Viceroy of Naples. His children:Johann Ernst Emanuel (d. 1739), Bishop of NitraFerdinand Bonaventura II (1708–1778), Governor of Milan
 Friedrich August von Harrach-Rohrau (1696–1749), Governor of the Austrian Netherlands. His grandsons:
 Ernest Christopher Joseph (1757-1838)
 Ferdinand Joseph (d. 1841). His children: Auguste von Harrach (1800–1873) — second wife to king Frederick William III of Prussia
 Karl Philip (d. 1878). His son:
 Ferdinand (1832–1915) — painter.
 Johann Philipp Graf von Harrach (1678–1764), Austrian field marshal
  Ernst Guido (1732–1783) Maria Josefa von Harrach (1727–1788), Princess of Liechtenstein, wife of Johann Nepomuk Karl, Prince of Liechtenstein
 Karl Borromäus von Harrach (1761–1829) — honorary Chief Physician at the Elisabethine Hospital in Vienna.
 Johann Nepomuk von Harrach (1828–1909) — Czech politician
 Lieutenant Colonel Count Franz von Harrach (1870–1934), Franz Ferdinand's bodyguard when he was assassinated in Sarajevo on June 28, 1914.
 Countess Stephanie Harrach, Johann Harrach's (d. 1945) widow, current member of family
 Beppo Harrach'', modern rally pilot, count Ernst Harrach's son

See also
 List of counts of Austria-Hungary
 Mediatized houses

Notes

References
 Reichenberger, Arnold G., The Counts Harrach and the Spanish Theater

External links

Rohrau Castle – Official site
Count Harrach Collection at liechtensteinmuseum.at
Pedigree list